Richard W. Niemann (born July 2, 1946) is a former American basketball player who played at center in the National Basketball Association and American Basketball Association. Niemann was originally drafted in the fourth round of the 1968 NBA draft by the Detroit Pistons. That season, he was traded from the Pistons to the Milwaukee Bucks along with cash for Dave Gambee. Later that year, he was claimed by the Boston Celtics after he was waived by the Bucks. After his time with the Celtics, he played the rest of his career in the American Basketball Association playing for the Carolina Cougars, the Miami Floridians, and the Dallas Chaparrals. Afterwards he taught chemistry and physics and coached baseball and basketball at several St. Louis area high schools for over 30 years.

Career statistics

NBA

Regular season

|-
| align="left" | 1968–69
| align="left" | Detroit
| 16 || - || 7.7 || .426 || - || .800 || 2.6 || 0.6 || - || - || 3.0
|-
| align="left" | 1968–69
| align="left" | Milwaukee
| 18 || - || 8.3 || .407 || - || .733 || 3.3 || 0.4 || - || - || 3.3
|-
| align="left" | 1969–70
| align="left" | Boston
| 6 || - || 3.0 || .400 || - || 1.000 || 1.0 || 0.3 || - || - || 1.0
|- class="sortbottom"
| style="text-align:center;" colspan="2"| Career
| 40 || - || 7.3 || .414 || - || .778 || 2.7 || 0.5 || - || - || 2.8
|}

ABA

Regular season

|-
| align="left" | 1969–70
| align="left" | Carolina
| 63 || - || 23.3 || .474 || .000 || .734 || 8.9 || 1.4 || - || - || 11.3
|-
| align="left" | 1970–71
| align="left" | Floridians
| 51 || - || 12.6 || .502 || .000 || .717 || 5.0 || 0.6 || - || - || 5.6
|-
| align="left" | 1971–72
| align="left" | Dallas
| 33 || - || 15.9 || .490 || .000 || .735 || 4.7 || 0.7 || - || - || 3.7
|- class="sortbottom"
| style="text-align:center;" colspan="2"| Career
| 147 || - || 17.9 || .483 || .000 || .731 || 6.6 || 1.0 || - || - || 7.6
|}

Playoffs

|-
| align="left" | 1969–70
| align="left" | Carolina
| 4 || - || 12.8 || .375 || .000 || 1.000 || 3.0 || 0.5 || - || - || 3.8
|-
| align="left" | 1970–71
| align="left" | Floridians
| 1 || - || 2.0 || .500 || .000 || .000 || 0.0 || 0.0 || - || - || 2.0
|- class="sortbottom"
| style="text-align:center;" colspan="2"| Career
| 5 || - || 10.6 || .389 || .000 || 1.000 || 2.4 || 0.4 || - || - || 3.4
|}

References

1946 births
Living people
American men's basketball players
Basketball players from St. Louis
Boston Celtics players
Carolina Cougars players
Centers (basketball)
Dallas Chaparrals players
Detroit Pistons draft picks
Detroit Pistons players
Miami Floridians players
Milwaukee Bucks players
Saint Louis Billikens men's basketball players